Ajloun Baptist School (Arabic: المدرسة المعمدانية - عجلون) is a private, co-educational school based in Jordan. Founded in 1952, the school is made up equally of Christian and Muslim Students. The school originally offered K-12 education but currently offers K-9. It can accommodate up to 452 students. It is the oldest of two Baptist schools located in Jordan.

See also

 Education in Jordan
 History of Jordan
 Index of Jordan-related articles
 List of schools in Jordan

References

Elementary and primary schools in Jordan
Educational institutions established in 1952
1952 establishments in Jordan
High schools and secondary schools in Jordan
Baptist schools
Religious schools in Jordan